Septopezizella is a genus of fungi in the family Helotiaceae. This is a monotypic genus, containing the single species Septopezizella oreadum.

References

External links
Septopezizella at Index Fungorum

Helotiaceae
Monotypic Ascomycota genera